Cross Plains is a city in Robertson County, Tennessee. The city's population was 1,789 at the 2020 census. Cross Plains was the first area of Robertson County that was settled by European settlers, with the arrival of Thomas Kilgore in 1778.

History
In 1778, American Revolutionary War veteran Thomas Kilgore arrived at the Middle Fork of Red River, three-fourths of a mile west of Cross Plains, making him the first European settler to arrive in Robertson County. Kilgore traveled to this area to claim 640 acres of land, which was guaranteed to settlers who traveled west by the Legislature of North Carolina. Kilgore returned to eastern North Carolina in the fall of 1778, and after the title of his land was confirmed, he traveled back to his settlement with a few other families, and built a stockade which would be known as Kilgore Station. The first building was a double log house erected by William Randolph in 1819. It was also used as a tavern.

In 1873, J.M. Walton established Neophogen College, a private university which operated until 1877. Thomas Drugs opened in 1915; it is one of the oldest establishments in Cross Plains.

In 2004, construction began on "Kilgore Park" located beside East Robertson High School. Construction was completed in 2008. In 2020, the Cross Plains city government announced that they had purchased 148 acres of land on Highway 25 west of Kilgore Park for $1.08 million. City officials stated that the land was purchased for future uses such as an expansion of Kilgore Park, or new schools.

Education

East Robertson Elementary School (Pre-K–5th) and East Robertson High School  (6-12) are the two public schools of Cross Plains.

Geography

Transportation
Highways

  Interstate 65
  /  U.S. Route 31W / Tennessee State Route 41
  Tennessee State Route 25

Decommissioned highways
  Tennessee State Route 79

The major east-west route, State Route 25 (SR 25), is a thoroughfare between Springfield and Gallatin. Interstate 65 (I-65) is a major north-south route between Louisville, Kentucky and Nashville. It intersects SR 25 on exit 112. US 31W, the predecessor to I-65, runs east of the latter route parallel to it. It provides an alternate route for local drivers to White House and Portland.

History

In the late 19th century, two major stagecoach routes ran through Cross Plains. The Louisville and Nashville Turnpike ran on the eastern end of town on the border of Robertson and Sumner County and the Hopkinsville and Gallatin Road ran through downtown and east toward Gallatin. The first state route to run through the modern Cross Plains area was State Route 79 in the 1920s, it ran on the old Louisville and Nashville Turnpike. State Route 79 was replaced by U.S. Route 31W in November 1926. The second and last state route to be routed through Cross Plains was State Route 25 which was extended west of Gallatin to Cross Plains by 1939. It replaced the Hopkinsville and Gallatin Road. Around 1953, the original curvy routing of US 31W was replaced by a straighter and more direct route. This rerouting abandoned a stone bridge that has been used since at least 1841. Segments of the old road still see use today as simply "Old Highway 31W". Construction on I-65 near Cross Plains began around 1970. By December 1972, the section south of Cross Plains was complete. Beginning in 2021, the section of Interstate 65 became subject to widening to alleviate traffic strains.

Demographics

2020 census

As of the 2020 United States census, there were 1,789 people, 689 households, and 513 families residing in the city.

2000 census
As of the census of 2000, there were 1,381 people, 504 households, and 400 families residing in the city. The population density was 166.8 people per square mile (64.4/km2). There were 536 housing units at an average density of 64.7 per square mile (25.0/km2). The racial makeup of the city was 94.06% White, 3.19% African American, 0.22% Native American, 0.14% Asian, 0.14% Pacific Islander, 0.22% from other races, and 2.03% from two or more races. Hispanic or Latino of any race were 1.23% of the population.

There were 504 households, out of which 36.7% had children under the age of 18 living with them, 63.1% were married couples living together, 11.1% had a female householder with no husband present, and 20.6% were non-families. 16.5% of all households were made up of individuals, and 6.0% had someone living alone who was 65 years of age or older. The average household size was 2.74 and the average family size was 3.06.

In the city, the population was spread out, with 27.4% under the age of 18, 7.0% from 18 to 24, 30.1% from 25 to 44, 26.2% from 45 to 64, and 9.3% who were 65 years of age or older. The median age was 37 years. For every 100 females, there were 106.7 males. For every 100 females age 18 and over, there were 101.4 males.

The median income for a household in the city was $42,279, and the median income for a family was $47,143. Males had a median income of $37,424 versus $24,792 for females. The per capita income for the city was $17,792. About 8.1% of families and 12.0% of the population were below the poverty line, including 17.9% of those under age 18 and 20.6% of those age 65 or over.

References

External links
 Cross Plains Community Chamber

Cities in Tennessee
Cities in Robertson County, Tennessee
Populated places established in 1819